My Radio Sure Sounds Good to Me is the sixth album by Larry Graham & Graham Central Station.

Released in 1978, the record marked the first time that Graham called his band Larry Graham & Graham Central Station (as opposed to simply Graham Central Station). The album peaked at number eighteen on the Billboard Top Soul Albums chart.

Track listing 
All songs written by Larry Graham.

"Pow" 	4:42 	
"My Radio Sure Sounds Good To Me" 	3:57 	
"Is It Love?" 	6:37 	
"Boogie Witcha, Baby" 	3:47 	
"It's The Engine in Me" 	5:16 	
"Turn It Out" 	4:37 	
"Mr. Friend" 	3:39 	
"Are You Happy?" 	4:53

Personnel 
Larry Graham - bass, lead and backing vocals, clavinet, guitar
Gaylord "Flash" Birch - drums 
Gemi Taylor - guitar
Nate Ginsberg - keyboards
Robert "Butch" Sam -  keyboards, backing vocals, organ, piano
Tina Graham - backing vocals

Charts

Singles

References

External links
 Graham Central Station-My Radio Sure Sounds Good to Me at Discogs

1978 albums
Graham Central Station albums
Warner Records albums